The 1937 Ladies Open Championships was held at the Queen's Club, West Kensington in London from 25–31 January 1937. Margot Lumb won her third consecutive title defeating Mrs Sheila McKechnie in the final.

Seeds

Draw and results

First round

Second round

Third round

Quarter-finals

Semi-finals

Final

References

Women's British Open Squash Championships
Women's British Open Squash Championships
Women's British Open Squash Championships
Women's British Open Squash Championships
Squash competitions in London
British Open Championships